Imerimandroso is a town and commune in Madagascar. It belongs to the district of Ambatondrazaka, which is a part of Alaotra-Mangoro Region. The population of the commune was estimated to be approximately 11,000 in 2001 commune census.

Primary and junior level secondary education are available in town. The majority 80% of the population of the commune are farmers, while an additional 4% receives their livelihood from raising livestock. The most important crops are cowpeas and peanuts, while other important agricultural products are maize, cassava and rice.  Services provide employment for 1% of the population. Additionally fishing employs 15% of the population.

Transport 
The district is linked to Moramanga by the  Route nationale 44 (Moramanga - Ambatondrazaka - Imerimandroso - Amboavory).

Nature
The Maningory Falls of the Maningory River are situated at 20 km from Imerimandroso.

References and notes 

Populated places in Alaotra-Mangoro